Bueng Sam Phan is a district (amphoe) in the southern part of Phetchabun province, northern Thailand.

History 
Tambon Sap Samo Thot was created by separating it from Tambon Ban Phot, Nong Phai district in 1966. On 15 May 1975 tambon Sap Samo Thot together with tambons Sap Mai Daeng, Nong Chaeng, and Kan Chu were split from Nong Phai District to create the minor district (king amphoe) Bueng Sam Phan. It was named Bueng Sam Phan ('Sam Phan pond') after the most important water resource of the district. 

The minor district was upgraded to a full district on 25 March 1979.

Geography
Neighboring districts are (from the north clockwise) Chon Daen and Nong Phai of Phetchabun Province, Phakdi Chumphon of Chaiyaphum province, Wichian Buri of Phetchabun, and Phaisali and Nong Bua of Nakhon Sawan province.

Administration
The district is divided into nine sub-districts (tambons), which are further subdivided into 117 villages (mubans). Sap Samo Thot is a township (thesaban tambon) and covers parts of tambons Sap Samo Thot and Bueng Sam Phan. There are nine tambon administrative organizations (TAO).

References

External links
amphoe.com

Bueng Sam Phan